Primorsko-Akhtarsk is an air base of the Russian Air Force as part of the 4th Air and Air Defence Forces Army, Southern Military District.

The base was first used in 1954 by a regiment (1689th) of the Yeysk aviation school. Today it is home to the 960th Assault Aviation Regiment (960th ShAP) which has two squadrons of Sukhoi Su-25SM/SM3 (NATO: Frogfoot-A)

The 559th Bomber Aviation Regiment deployed here from Morozovsk (air base) with their Sukhoi Su-34's as part of the 2022 Russian invasion of Ukraine.

References

Russian Air Force bases
Buildings and structures in Krasnodar Krai
Military installations established in the 1950s